Gérard Marx is a French César Award nominee director.

Filmography

References

External links

Living people
French film directors
French male screenwriters
French screenwriters
French-language film directors
Year of birth missing (living people)